This is a complete filmography of Katy Jurado. Jurado began her career in 1943. After a notable career in the Mexican films, she went to Hollywood in the late 1940s. During the 1950s and 1960s, she appeared in notable films such as High Noon (1952), Arrowhead, Broken Lance (1954), Trapeze (1956), One-Eyed Jacks, (1960), Stay Away, Joe (1968) and many others. She was the first Latin American and Mexican woman Golden Globe Award winner and Academy Award nominee. In 1992, she received the Golden Boot Award by her notable contribution to the western movies.

Filmography

1943 – 1949

1950 – 1958

1961 – 1970

1970 – 2002

Short films appearing as herself

Television

Theatre

References 
 
 

Actress filmographies
Mexican filmographies